The tar (from ) is a long-necked, waisted lute family instrument, used by many cultures and countries including Iran, Azerbaijan, Uzbekistan, Armenia, Georgia, Tajikistan (Iranian Plateau), Turkey, and others near the Caucasus and Central Asia regions. The older and more complete name of the tār is čāhārtār or čārtār, meaning in Persian "four string", (čāhār frequently being shorted to čār). This is in accordance with a practice common in Persian-speaking areas of distinguishing lutes on the basis of the number of strings originally employed. Beside the čārtār, these include the dotār (دوتار, “two string”), setār (سه‌تار, “three string”), pančtār (پنجتار “five string”), and šaštār or šeštār (ششتار “six string”).

It was revised into its current sound range in the 18th century and has since remained one of the most important musical instruments in Iran and the Caucasus, particularly in Persian and Azerbaijani traditional music, and the favoured instrument for radifs and mughams.

Physical characteristics

The most easily identifiable feature is the double-bowl shaped body carved from mulberry wood, with a thin membrane covering the top. The membrane is of stretched lamb-skin in the Persian tar, or the pericardium of an ox in the Azerbaijani (or Caucasian) tar. The fingerboard has twenty-five to twenty-eight adjustable gut frets. The Persian tar has three double courses of strings and a range of about two and one-half octaves. The Caucasian tar has 11 strings in five paired courses plus a bass drone. 

The long and narrow neck has a flat fingerboard running level to the membrane and ends in an elaborate pegbox with six/11 wooden tuning pegs of different dimensions, adding to the decorative effect.

The strings of the Persian tar
It has three courses of double "singing" strings (each pair tuned in unison: the first two courses in plain steel, the third in wound copper), that are tuned root, fifth, octave (C, G, C), plus one "flying" bass string (wound in copper and tuned to G, an octave lower than the singing middle course) that runs outside the fingerboard and passes over an extension of the nut. Every String has its own tuning peg and are tuned independently. The Persian tar used to have five strings. The sixth string was added to the tar by Darvish Khan. This string is today's fifth string of the Iranian tar.

Modes of play
The instrument is held high on the breast, plucked at the centre of the body using a small brass plectrum known in Persian/Azerbaijani as a mezrab/mizrab. That is held in the right hand and used in a combination of upstrokes (alt) and downstrokes (üst) along with occasional tremolos in both directions. Meanwhile the notes are selected by the placing of the fingers of the left hand, with notes sometimes bent by a motion of the placed finger as in blues guitar. The addition of an un-plucked note as a trill on top of the plucked bass note is known in Azerbaijani as lal barmaq – literally “muted finger”., while a somewhat similar effect called jirmag is achieved by using the fingernail to strike the string. This gives a more poignant 'scratching' sound.

Azerbaijani tar

The "Azerbaijani tar", "Caucasus tar" or the "11 string tar" is an instrument in a slightly different shape from the Iranian Tar and was developed from the Persian tar around 1870 by Sadigjan. It has a slightly different build and has more strings. The Azerbaijani tar has further one extra bass-string on the side, on a raised nut, and usually 2 double resonance strings via small metal nuts halfway through the neck. All these strings are running next to the main strings over the bridge and are fixed to a string-holder and the edge of the body. Overall the Azerbaijani tar has 11 strings and 17 tones. It is considered the national instrument of Azerbaijan.

According to the Encyclopædia Iranica, Azeri art music is also performed in other regions of the Caucasus, mainly among Armenians who have adopted the mugham system and musical instruments such as the kemancha and tar.

A tar is depicted on the reverse of the Azerbaijani 1 qəpik coin minted since 2006 and on the obverse of the Azerbaijani 1 manat banknote issued since 2006.

In 2012, the craftsmanship and performance art of the tar in Azerbaijan was added to the UNESCO's List of the Intangible Cultural Heritage of Humanity.

Music therapy
The melodies performed on tar were considered useful for headache, insomnia and melancholy, as well as for eliminating nervous and muscle spasms. Listening to this instrument was believed to induce a quiet and philosophical mood, compelling the listener to reflect upon life. Its solemn melodies were thought to cause a person to relax and fall asleep.

The author of Qabusnameh (11th century) recommends that when selecting musical tones (pardeh), to take into account the temperament of the listener (see Four temperaments). He suggested that lower pitched tones (bam) were effective for persons of sanguine and phlegmatic temperaments, while higher pitched tones (zeer) were helpful for those who were identified with a choleric temperament or melancholic temperament.

Use in contemporary music 
The tar features prominently in Jeff Wayne's Musical Version of The War of the Worlds, in the section "Horsell Common and the Heat Ray". George Fenton played it on the original album, and Gaetan Schurrer can be seen playing one on the DVD of the 2006 production.

Gallery

See also
 Music of Azerbaijan
 Music of Iran

References

External links

 About Persian Tar
 Nay-Nava the Encyclopedia of Persian Music Instruments
 Dariush Talai
 Persian Tar Audio Samples
 Medieval music therapy
 Farabi School 

Azerbaijani musical instruments
Musical instruments of Georgia (country)
Kurdish musical instruments
Armenian musical instruments
Necked bowl lutes
Drumhead lutes
Iranian inventions
Persian musical instruments
Iranian musical instruments